Daniel Franziskus (born 13 August 1991) is a German retired professional footballer who played as a forward. He works as a scout and is a part of the coaching team at VfB Lübeck.

Career
Franziskus made his professional debut for Regensburg on 7 September 2013 in a 3. Liga match against 1. FC Saarbrücken.

Later career
On 10 October 2019, 28-year old Franziskus announced his retirement after a long knee injury, where he was told, that he could never play football with his knee again. On 14 November 2019 VfB Lübeck confirmed, that Franziskus had been hired as a scout and in the coaching team of the Regionalliga Nord side.

References

External links
 
 

Living people
1991 births
German footballers
Association football forwards
3. Liga players
VfB Oldenburg players
SV Wilhelmshaven players
SSV Jahn Regensburg II players
SSV Jahn Regensburg players
TSG Neustrelitz players
VfB Lübeck players
People from Aurich
Footballers from Lower Saxony